PhilPapers is an interactive academic database of journal articles in philosophy. It is maintained by the Centre for Digital Philosophy at the University of Western Ontario, and as of 2022, it has "394,867 registered users, including the majority of professional philosophers and graduate students." The general editors are its founders, David Bourget and David Chalmers.

PhilPapers receives financial support from other organizations, including a substantial grant in early 2009 from the Joint Information Systems Committee in the United Kingdom. The archive is praised for its comprehensiveness and organization, and for its regular updates. In addition to archiving papers, the editors run and publish the most extensive ongoing survey of academic philosophers.

See also 
 List of academic databases and search engines

References

External links 

Philosophical literature
Online databases
Philosophical databases
Bibliographic databases and indexes
Internet properties established in 2006
Philosophy Documentation Center academic journals
University of Western Ontario